Novocastrians Rugby Football Club is a rugby union team that is situated in the North East of England and currently play their rugby in Durham/Northumberland 1. The club is more generally known as Novos. Novos were formed in September 1899 as Old Novocastrians Rugby Football Club by a group of former pupils of the Royal Grammar School, Newcastle upon Tyne. The club remained for Old Boys or members of staff of the school until 1969 when the 'Old' was dropped and the club became open to all. Novos used to regularly field seven senior sides in the 1980s and 1990s. Currently, the club fields three senior sides, two ladies' sides, a 35+ year old side and also a junior section.

History
On 12 September 1899, Old Novocastrians Rugby Football Club was formed by a group of former pupils of the Royal Grammar School, Newcastle. A letter was sent out reading ‘A proposed new club for Newcastle: A meeting will be held at the Grammar School, Rye Hill under the auspices of Old Novocastrians Club, for the purpose of forming a new rugby club. The attendance of Grammar school boys is specially required.’

Novos had many grounds until in 1925 Sir Arthur Sutherland bought Benton Lodge for the club to play rugby on and also paid for the clubhouse to be built, in 1928, which is still in use today. The ground was renamed Sutherland Park just a few years later. In the inter war years the club experienced good fortune at their new ground, with an exciting brand of 'school boy' rugby. Novos reached the Northumberland Senior Cup Final on three occasions in the 1930s but failed to win the trophy that continues to elude the club.

The club was struggling on and off the field after the club became 'open' in 1969. John Elders, England Head Coach (1972–74) and sports master at the Royal Grammar School combated this in the 1970s and 1980s and became a key advocate for the  club, helping bring many players to Novos throughout the 1960s, 70s and 80s. This laid the foundations for Novos to become a powerful rugby force in the 1980s and early 1990s.

The 1987-88 season saw a revolution in Community Rugby with the introduction of Leagues. Novos were in a strong position and were allocated above the Durham & Northumberland leagues into North East 2. In the first season an unbeaten record saw promotion to North East 1 where they played with mixed fortunes for six years. Whilst in North 1 East, Novos would compete with sides like Rotherham and Blaydon. 'Vos also managed to beat Newcastle Falcons (then known as Gosforth) on occasion in the fiercely contested New Year's Day games.  During this golden period seven sides were fielded most Saturdays, with four sides playing at home; with a side playing at the nearby Paddy Freeman's field. A great camaraderie set over the club with vast playing numbers and a busy bar.

Novos currently play in Durham/Northumberland 1 after winning promotion from Durham/Northumberland 2 in 2013. In 2016, Novos won their first ever senior Northumberland County competition winning the Northumberland Senior Plate.

Honours
North East 2 champions: 1987–88
Durham/Northumberland 3 champions: 2001–02
Northumberland Senior Plate winners (2): 2016, 2018

Notable former players
Nick Brownlee (born 1967) Crime thriller writer
John Elders (1930–2015) England Rugby Head Coach, Leicester Tigers Captain and Old Novocastrians Captain
Sarah Hunter (born 1985) England Women’s International and Captain
John Jeffrey (born 1959) Scottish International
Jim Pollock (born 1958) Scottish International, Barbarian FC and Novocastrians Captain
Peter Taylor, Baron Taylor of Gosforth (1930–1997), Lord Chief Justice (1992–96)

References

External links
 

Sport in Newcastle upon Tyne
English rugby union teams